Kwahu South District is one of the thirty-three districts in Eastern Region, Ghana. Originally created as an ordinary district assembly in 1988, which was created from the former Kwahu District Council. Later, the southwest part of the district was split off to create Kwahu West District in August 2004 (which it later was elevated to municipal district assembly status on 1 July 2007 (effectively 29 February 2008) to become Kwahu West Municipal District); thus the remaining part has been retained as Kwahu South District. Then the northwest part of the district was split off to create Kwahu East District on 29 February 2008; thus the remaining part has been still retained as Kwahu South District. The district assembly is located in the western part of Eastern Region and has Mpraeso as its capital town.

List of settlements
Kwahu South District also contains the small town of Atibie. The other main small towns of Kwahu South District include: Bepong and Obo. Kwahu South District is popular for the Kwahu Easter holiday, at which time the Kwahu South District people is overcrowded.

Sources
 
 District: Kwahu South
 Eastern Region: Kwahu South

References

Districts of the Eastern Region (Ghana)